Burghard is a German language surname. It stems from the male given name Burchard – and may refer to:
George E. Burghard (1895–1963), American philatelist 
Günter Burghard (1942), Austrian ice hockey player

References

German-language surnames
Surnames from given names